Tabernaemontana stapfiana (commonly known as soccerball fruit) is a medium-sized tree in the family Apocynaceae. Its flowers feature white with yellow-throated corolla lobes. Its habitat is montane evergreen forests from  altitude. The plant is native to an area of Africa from Uganda south to Mozambique.

References

stapfiana
Plants described in 1894
Flora of West-Central Tropical Africa
Flora of East Tropical Africa
Flora of South Tropical Africa
Afromontane flora